Amuru is a town in the Northern Region of Uganda. It is the main municipal, administrative, and commercial centre of Amuru District.

Location

The coordinates of the town are 2°49'07.0"N, 31°51'51.0"E (Latitude:2.8186; Longitude:31.8642).

Overview
Amuru town council was established as headquarters of Amuru District circa 2006. Like many newly created Ugandan districts, and municipalities, Amuru Town Council and Amuru District face many challenges, including lack of adequate funding, a small and inadequate tax base, lack of sufficient numbers of qualified professional and administrative staff, poor or absent infrastructure and corruption.

Population
In 2015, the Uganda Bureau of Statistics (UBOS) estimated the population of the town at 9,500. In 2020, the population agency estimated the mid-year population of Amuru Town Council at 10,800 inhabitants. Of those, 5,400 (50 percent) were females and 5,400 (50 percent) were males. UBOS calculated that the population of the town increased at an average rate of 2.6 percent every year, between 2015 and 2020.

Points of interest
The following additional points of interest lie within the town limits or close to the edges of the town:
(a) the offices of Amuru Town Council (b) the offices of Amuru District Administration (c) Amuru central market, the source of daily fresh produce and (d) Amuru Prison, a corrections facility administered by Uganda Prisons Service, with capacity of over 200 inmates.

See also
Acholi people
List of cities and towns in Uganda

References

External links
 Information on Amuru Town Council As of 23 July 2021.
Amuru Leaders Concerned With Slow Pace of Development In The Town Centre

Amuru District
Populated places in Northern Region, Uganda
Cities in the Great Rift Valley